The 2015 NAB AFL Under 18 Championships was the 20th edition of the AFL Under 18 Championships. Eight teams competed in the championships: Vic Metro, Vic Country, South Australia and Western Australia in division one, and New South Wales/Australian Capital Territory (NSW/ACT), Northern Territory, Queensland and Tasmania competed in division two. The competition was played over six rounds across two divisions.

Vic Country won the division one title, and Queensland were the champions of division two. Both teams finished the championships undefeated.

Fixture

Division 1

Division 2

All-Australian team
The All-Australian team was selected by Kevin Sheehan (AFL national and international talent manager), Brenton Sanderson (AFL Academy head coach), Michael Ablett (AFL talent football manager), Lenny Hayes (football projects officer), Michael Agresta (recruiting manager), Merv Keane (recruiting manager), Dom Milesi (recruiting manager), Chris Drain (recruiting manager), and Simon Dalrymple (recruiting manager).

References

Under-18